Pierre Claver Nahimana is a member of the Pan-African Parliament from Burundi.

References

Year of birth missing (living people)
Living people
Members of the Pan-African Parliament from Burundi
Place of birth missing (living people)